The S-99 experimental submarine was the only ship of the Project 617 class (codenamed Whale) that the Soviet Union built during the early Cold War. She was the only Soviet submarine which used a German Walter turbine fueled by high-test peroxide (HTP). Entering service in 1956, the boat was assigned to a training unit of the Baltic Fleet. S-99 was badly damaged by a HTP explosion in 1959 and was not repaired. The submarine was decommissioned in 1964 and subsequently scrapped.

Background
At the end of the Second World War, the Soviets captured components for the HTP-fuelled Type XXVI submarine as well as engineers and technicians who had worked on the Walter turbine that used HTP. To make use of this new technology, they established a new submarine design bureau in Germany headed by Engineer-Captain Aleksei A. Antipin, formerly head of Central Design Bureau No. 18 (TsKB-18), which was tasked with the collection of plans and documents relating to the Type XXVI and its components. TsKB-18 began designing a copy of the German submarine as Project 616 in 1946, intending to order components from East Germany, but this was rejected by the Soviet Navy as it did not meet Soviet standards for reserve buoyancy and other issues. Together with the Central Research Shipbuilding Institute No. 45, the bureau immediately then began an original design utilizing the Walter HTP turbine. Preliminary design work on  Project 617 was finished at the end of 1947.

A new design bureau for high-speed submarines (SKB-143) was established on 30 March 1948 and the Antipin Bureau was folded into the new organization with Antipin in charge. Knowing that the Walter HTP turbine technology was unproven, he decided to construct the submarine's propulsion plant and its hull compartment in a building at the Sudomekh Shipyard in Leningrad. The turbine used original German-built components as much as possible and was tested through the beginning of 1951. It was carefully disassembled in May and repaired as necessary in preparation for installation in S-99 which had begun construction a few months prior.

Description 
S-99 was a double-hulled submarine that displaced  on the surface and  submerged. S-99s crew numbered 51 officers and men. Her hull was divided into six compartments; the sail was very small and did not have a compartment. The hull was fitted with anechoic tiles captured from the Germans. The boat had a reserve buoyancy of 28%, enough to remain afloat with any single compartment flooded, a figure more than two and a half times greater than that of the Type XXVI. In service, she proved to be maneuverable and was very noisy at full speed.

This passed into a combustion chamber into which kerosene was injected. The resulting combustion converted the oxygen into carbon dioxide and carbon monoxide and further increased the mixture's temperature and pressure. The steam/gas mixture was passed through a condenser to recover the water while the combustion gases were exhausted into the ocean. S-99s turbine could generate  in shallow water, but only  at depths of  because the pressure of the deeper water created more back pressure which reduced the turbine's efficiency.

S-99 was also provided with a diesel-electric system that consisted of a  8Ch-23/30 diesel engine and a  PG-100 electric motor for cruising. An additional  electric motor was intended for slow speeds underwater and could be powered by either the 112 Type 26-SU battery cells or a  DG-17 diesel generator. The boat was fitted with a folding snorkel to allow the diesel engines to operate while underwater.

Plastic bladders between the pressure hull and the outer hull held  of very expensive hydrogen peroxide. S-99 carried enough supplies for 45 days of operation.

The boat's armament consisted of six  torpedo tubes mounted in the bow, each with one reload. Alternatively, 20 AMD-1000 naval mines could be carried. S-99 was fitted with a Tamir-5LS sonar, Mars-24-KEG hydrophones and a Nakat surface-search radar (NATO reporting name: Snoop Plate).

Construction and career 
S-99 was laid down on 5 February 1951 at the Shipyard No. 196 and launched on 5 February 1952. Naval historians vary on when the boat was commissioned or completed: Pavlov says she was completed in December 1955, but Friedman says she was commissioned on 6 June 1952 while Polmar and Moore give 26 March 1956. The boat's sea trials began on 16 June 1952 and lasted for years. Less than a year later, SKB-143 was pulled from Project 617 in March 1953 and tasked with developing a nuclear-powered submarine; TsKB-18 assumed responsibility for the project. Despite the testing of the Walter turbine ashore, the sea trials revealed that S-99 still had problems when HTP would decompose on contact with dirt or oil, causing fires or explosions.

During this time, TsKB-18 worked on Project 617M, an enlarged design with additional HTP and fuel as well as improved weapons and sensors. Work on all of these was canceled in 1960 when all of the closed-cycle projects were terminated.

Upon commissioning, S-99 was assigned to a training brigade of the Baltic Fleet. About  of the latter used the Walter turbine. On 17 May 1959 S-99 was cruising at a depth of  when the turbine was started. This caused an explosion in the turbine compartment when HTP encountered mud in the hull valve of the HTP supply pipe. The resulting decomposition blew a  hole in the pressure hull which caused the two rear compartments to partially flood. The submarine was able to surface and reached base on battery power. S-99 was not repaired because it was unfeasible to replace all of the damaged German parts. The submarine was not fully repaired and was reclassified as an experimental submarine on 31 August 1961. She was decommissioned on 28 February 1964 and later scrapped.

See also 
 German Type XVII submarine
 HMS Meteorite

References

Bibliography

External links
 deepstorm.ru // Project 617 (NATO - "Whale")
 deepstorm.ru // S-99 of Project 617

Submarines of the Soviet Navy
Ships built in the Soviet Union
1952 ships
Experimental submarines
Cold War submarines of the Soviet Union
Russian and Soviet navy submarine classes
Soviet submarine accidents